The Croatian Wikipedia is the Croatian version of Wikipedia, the free encyclopedia, started on February 16, 2003.
This version has  articles and a total of  edits have been made (live count).

Since 2013, the Croatian Wikipedia has received attention from international media for promoting a fascist worldview as well as bias against Serbs of Croatia and anti-LGBT propaganda by the means of historical denialism and by negating or diluting the severity of crimes committed by the Ustaše regime. Apart from whitewashing the crimes and vices of World War II-era criminals, the same is done for contemporary Croatian politicians and public figures; this is supported through massive usage of unreliable sources.

Throughout 2014, fewer than two dozen editors made more than 100 edits a month; around 150 made more than 5 edits a month. Over 750 articles are ranked as featured.

2011 reliability analysis 
In a study by Kubelka and Šoštarić from 2011, the reliability of the Croatian Wikipedia was compared to the Croatian Encyclopedia – the Croatian national encyclopedia. Twenty-four reviewers, experts in specific fields, analyzed a representative selection of articles according to the parameters of informativeness, accuracy of presented information, sufficiency, direction and objectivity. Articles were analyzed in 11 thematic categories: arts and culture; history and biographies; medicine and health; technology and applied science; geography; religion; science; mathematics and logic; philosophy; sport and society; and social sciences. Articles were sorted into categories using machine learning techniques, and feature weight statistics were calculated using tf–idf. A total of 500 articles in 250 pairs were randomly chosen and sorted into categories to serve as representative samples.

In both samples, facts were manually enumerated – 3015 from the Croatian Encyclopedia and 3315 from Croatian Wikipedia. Comparison for factual accuracy showed that for every error in the Croatian Encyclopedia, 2.25 errors were found in Croatian Wikipedia. Analysis by individual categories showed that most errors in Croatian Wikipedia were in the philosophy category, where on average two errors in ten articles were found. The only category where the Croatian Encyclopedia had more errors was natural sciences, where the ratio was 1.25:0.75 in favor of Croatian Wikipedia. Of those factual errors, the ratio was 21:12 for major errors, and 34:23 for minor errors. The overall ratio for minor factual errors was thus lower, the only exception being the society and social sciences category, where the minor error ratio was 3:1.

The reliability analysis for Croatian Wikipedia indicated that 74% of articles were error-free, and 11% had minor errors. Major factual errors were found in 5% of articles, while 4% of articles had both major and minor errors. Overall 85% of articles were deemed "satisfactory" (error-free and containing minor errors), while in comparison 92% of articles in the Croatian Encyclopedia achieved the same rating. Forty percent of articles in Croatian Wikipedia were assessed as sufficiently informative, as opposed to sixty-two percent of articles in the Croatian Encyclopedia. Sixteen percent of Croatian Wikipedia articles were assessed as "insufficiently informative", as opposed to five percent of articles from the Croatian Encyclopedia. The criterion of objectivity measured the neutral point of view in articles; 91% of Croatian Wikipedia articles were assessed as being neutral, as opposed to 98% in the Croatian Encyclopedia. Two percent of Croatian Wikipedia articles were assessed as non-neutral, as opposed to zero in the Croatian Encyclopedia. According to their subjective preference, reviewers chose 53% of articles in the Croatian Encyclopedia as their preferred article version, while only 19.5% of Wikipedia articles were preferred, with 27% of articles being assessed as equal in quality.

Controversy about right-wing bias

Media reports about bias 

In September 2013, complaints about right-wing bias of administrators and editors on the Croatian Wikipedia began to receive attention from the media, following the launch of a Facebook page titled Razotkrivanje sramotne hr.wikipedije which was created with the intent of bringing attention to the issue. According to Jurica Pavičić, a professor at the University of Split and Jutarnji list columnist, the gradual takeover of the Croatian Wikipedia was started in 2009 by "a small group of conservative administrators" who blocked editors for having "liberal-to-moderate views on controversial topics". Reported examples of bias include historical revisionism such as watering-down and denial of the crimes committed by the Ustashe regime, and equating anti-fascism with forms of totalitarianism. Other issues included the bias against Serbs of Croatia and the LGBT population. Editors who tried to remove the biased sections were reportedly being harassed by administrators and quickly received permanent blocks under various pretexts. The issue was reported by Croatia's daily Jutarnji list and even made its print edition's front page on 11 September 2013.

Government reaction 
Two days later, Croatia's Minister of Science, Education and Sports, Željko Jovanović, called for pupils and students in Croatia to avoid using the Croatian Wikipedia. In an interview given to Novi list, Jovanović said that "the idea of openness and relevance as a knowledge source that Wikipedia could and should represent has been completely discredited – which, for certain, has never been the goal of Wikipedia's creators nor the huge number of people around the world who share their knowledge and time using that medium. Croatian pupils and students have been wronged by this, so we have to warn them, unfortunately, that a large part of the content of the Croatian version of Wikipedia is not only dubious but also [contains] obvious forgeries, and therefore we invite them to use more reliable sources of information, which include Wikipedia in English and in other major languages of the world." Jovanović also commented on the Croatian Wikipedia editors – calling them a "minority group that has usurped the right to edit the Croatian-language Wikipedia".

Wikipedia's co-founder Jimmy Wales said that complaints about the bias of the Croatian Wikipedia were "nothing new", but that Jovanović's denunciation was alarming. Wales also reiterated his opinion that the existence of separate Croatian and Serbian Wikipedias, both written in Serbo-Croatian, is wrong.

Interviews with historians 
In 2013, in an interview given to Index.hr, Robert Kurelić, a professor of history at the Juraj Dobrila University of Pula, commented that "the Croatian Wikipedia is only a tool used by its administrators to promote their own political agendas, giving false and distorted facts". Some examples he listed include the Croatian Wikipedia's coverage of the term Istrijanstvo (Istrianism), defined as a "movement fabricated to reduce the number of Croats", and antifašizam (anti-fascism), which according to him was defined as the opposite of what it really means. Kurelić further advised "that it would be good if a larger number of people got engaged and started writing on Wikipedia", because "administrators want to exploit high-school and university students, the most common users of Wikipedia, to change their opinions and attitudes, which presents a serious issue".

Also in 2013, Snježana Koren, a historian at the Faculty of Humanities and Social Sciences, University of Zagreb, judged the disputed articles as "biased and malicious, partly even illiterate", in an interview with Croatian news agency HINA. She further added that "These are the types of articles you can find on the pages of fringe organizations and movements, but there should be no place for that on Wikipedia", expressing doubts on the ability of its authors to distinguish good from evil. Koren concluded that the ulterior motive of such writings was to rehabilitate the Independent State of Croatia, a puppet state of Nazi Germany, and that "there is no other way to characterize such efforts than as Ustashe movement".

The Croatian Wikipedia page on the Jasenovac concentration camp was regarded as a prime example of its historical revisionism and distortions. The Croatian version of the page referred to the WWII Jasenovac concentration camp as a "collection camp" and labour camp, downplayed the crimes committed there as well as the number of victims, and relied on "right-wing media and private blogs" for "a large number" of its references. Hrvoje Klasić, also a historian at the Faculty of Humanities and Social Sciences in Zagreb, stated to the Balkan Investigative Reporting Network in 2018 that "although Jasenovac was in part a labour camp, referring to it as that alone is misleading", arguing that "referring to Jasenovac as simply a collection and labour camp is to use 'the same language' as Ustasa propaganda", and also added that "a number of articles and topics are done in a completely revisionist manner [on the Croatian Wikipedia], with highly emphasised nationalist and, I would dare to say, pro-Ustasa sentiment".

Disinformation assessment by Wikimedia Foundation 

In 2021, the Wikimedia Foundation posted a job ad for a disinformation evaluator position, with the aim to further examine disputed content on the Croatian Wikipedia.

In March 2021, a number of changes were made to remove administrative access from a group of editors considered responsible for the entire affair, some of whom also had their names published in Croatian media. One of these was exposed to be an editor of a known far-right web portal.

In June 2021, Wikimedia published its Croatian Wikipedia Disinformation Assessment. It concluded that "A group of Croatian language Wikipedia (Hr.WP) admins held undue de-facto control over the project at least from 2011 to 2020. During that time, the group intentionally distorted the content presented in Croatian language Wikipedia articles in a way that matched the narratives of political organisations and groups that can broadly be defined as the Croatian radical right." According to the assessment, the administrators had abused their power to ban dissidents and selectively enforced and broke rules, resulting in project capture.

References

Further reading

External links 

  

Wikipedias by language
Wikipedia
Internet properties established in 2003
Croatian-language websites
Wikipedia controversies
Historical negationism